Hard Cash may refer to:

Hard Cash (novel), 1863 novel by Charles Reade about the poor treatment of patients in private insane asylums
Hard Cash, a 2-reel 1913 American silent film based on the Reade novel, directed by Charles M. Seay
Hard Cash, a 1921 British silent film based on the Reade novel, directed by Edwin J. Collins
Hard Cash (2002 film), an action film about an armed robbery
Hard Cash, 1876 ship
Hard Cash, Georgia, an unincorporated community in Elbert County, Georgia, United States
hard cash, a term referring to money in the form of coins or banknotes.

See also
Hardcash Productions, a current affairs TV production company